Fun-Can Be Dangerous Sometimes  is a 2005 Hindi Thriller film directed by Sunjay Zaveri and produced by Goldie Tucker. The film features Aryan Vaid, Siddharth Koirala, Payal Rohatgi and Hina Tasleem as main characters. The plot of the film revolves around husband swapping.

Story
A story about a group of couples in a vacation, suddenly decided on a  game of husband swapping. The story follows how this "fun" became dangerous later.

Cast
Siddharth Koirala as Aryan
Aryan Vaid as Raj
Hina Tasleem as Megha
Payal Rohatgi as Natasha
Rajat Bedi
Mushtaq Khan
Hemant Pandey
Mallika Nayyar
Gaurav Dixit
Basheer Ahemad

Music

The music of the film is composed by Sanjeev Darshan and lyricists are Nasir Faraaz, Rakhi Pundit and Sunil Jogi.

References

External links

Films scored by Sanjeev Darshan
2000s Hindi-language films
2005 films